New Buildings is a locality of the Bega Valley Shire in New South Wales, Australia. It sits at the junction of the Towamba River and the Mataganah Creek.

Heritage listings
New Buildings has a number of heritage-listed sites, including:
 New Buildings Bridge over Towamba River

References

Localities in New South Wales
Bega Valley Shire